Karakó is a village in Vas county, Hungary.

Etymology
The name comes from Slavic Krakov, see also Krakov (Czech Republic), Kraków (Poland) or Krakovany (Slovakia). 1156/1412 in parochia Crocoyensy.

References

Populated places in Vas County